The 1946–47 United States network television schedule was nominally from September 1946 to March 1947, but scheduling ideas were still being worked out and did not follow modern standards.

This was the first "network television season" in the United States, and only NBC and DuMont operated networks, as CBS only operated one television station, WCBS, and had yet to send out its programs to cities other than New York City. Additionally, several other companies—including Mutual, Paramount, and ABC—had plans to enter the medium over the next few years. Although experimental broadcasting had begun in the 1930s and television stations had been commercially licensed beginning in 1941, it was not until 1946 that coaxial cable connections allowed stations to share the same program schedules. Even then, only a few cities on the East Coast were connected.

Notable series on the schedule included the first network TV soap opera, Faraway Hill; the poorly-received but ambitious variety series, Hour Glass; the first network-televised game show, Cash and Carry (prior game shows had been single-station only); and the anthology series Kraft Television Theatre.

Few broadcasts made during this season exist in any archive, but segments of Campus Hoopla dating from 1947 exist in the Hubert Chain Collection of the earliest kinescopes still in existence, as preserved in the Library of Congress (Moving Image Collection).  Audio recordings of live TV broadcasts of this show are also on file at the Library of Congress from the 1946–47 period, as recorded from WNBT-TV in New York (NBC's original flagship station in New York City, today's WNBC-TV).

New series and those that made their network debuts during the season are highlighted in bold. Series ending are highlighted in italics.

Legend

Sunday

* Beginning in December 1946 on WNBT-TV, and then on January 5, 1947, on the NBC Network, Bristol-Myers Tele-Varieties, hosted by Jinx Falkenburg and Tex McCrary, aired Sundays from 8:15 to 8:30pm ET.

Monday

Tuesday

Wednesday

Thursday

Note: On DuMont, King Cole's Birthday Party was also known simply as Birthday Party. It debuted on Dumont′s New York City station, WABD on May 15, 1947. By early 1948 it was carried on the entire network, but the date it switched from a New York-only to a complete network broadcast is unclear.

Friday

Saturday

By network 
Some of the series below are not shown on the schedule as the day and time these aired are not currently known.

Du Mont 

Returning series
Boxing from Jamaica Arena
Cash and Carry
Magic Carpet
Melody Bar Ranch
Vera Massey Show
 Western movie

New series/network debuts
Doorway to Fame *
Faraway Hill
King Cole's Birthday Party *
Movies for Small Fry *
Play the Game
Serving Through Science

NBC 

Returning Series
Duffy's Tavern
The Esso Newsreel
Face to Face
Hour Glass
I Love to Eat
In Town Today
NFL Football Magazine
Television Quarterback
Voice of Firestone Televues
The World in Your Home

New series/Network debuts
The Borden Show *
Boxing from Madison Square Garden
Boxing from St. Nicholas Arena
Bristol-Myers Tele-Varieties *
Broadway Previews
Campus Hoopla *
Geographically Speaking
Hour Glass *
In the Kelvinator Kitchen *
Juvenile Jury *
Kraft Television Theatre *
Let's Rhumba
Musical Merry-Go-Round *
NBC Television Theatre
Television Screen Magazine
You Are an Artist

Note: The * indicates that the program was introduced in midseason.

References
 Bergmann, Ted; Skutch, Ira (2002). The DuMont Television Network: What Happened? Lanham, Maryland: Scarecrow Press. .
 Castleman, H. & Podrazik, W. (1982). Watching TV: Four Decades of American Television. New York: McGraw-Hill. 314 pp.
 Brooks, Tim & Marsh, Earl (1979). The complete directory to prime-time network TV shows 1946–present. New York: Ballantine Books.  .

United States primetime network television schedules
United States Network Television Schedule, 1946-47
United States Network Television Schedule, 1946-47